William Murdoch Hamilton (16 February 1938 – 22 October 1976) was a Scottish footballer, who played for Sheffield United, Middlesbrough, Heart of Midlothian, Hibernian and Aston Villa, and gained one cap for Scotland. He became known for his off field lifestyle which overshadowed his playing ability. His one-time manager Jock Stein later described him as comparable to Kenny Dalglish in footballing talent.

Career
Following spells in English football with Sheffield United and Middlesbrough, Hamilton joined Hearts in June 1962 and was then signed for Hibernian by Jock Stein. Despite having handed in a transfer request shortly before Stein's arrival, Stein was able to get some astonishing performances out of Hamilton during his time at Easter Road. Stein would sometimes put up Hamilton in his own house on the eve of a big match to make sure he did not go out drinking. Hibernian's results had dramatically picked up during Stein's reign, partly attributable to the performances of Hamilton. However, Stein left Hibernian after less than a year to become manager of Celtic.
 
He emigrated to Canada in 1975 where he worked as a bricklayer. He died of a heart attack in 1976.

References

Sources
 MacPherson, Archie. Jock Stein: The Definitive Biography. Highdown, 2005.

External links 

1938 births
1976 deaths
Scottish footballers
Scottish Football League players
English Football League players
Scotland international footballers
Aston Villa F.C. players
Hamilton Academical F.C. players
Heart of Midlothian F.C. players
Hibernian F.C. players
Middlesbrough F.C. players
Ross County F.C. players
Sheffield United F.C. players
Association football forwards
Scottish Football League representative players
Scottish expatriate footballers
Expatriate soccer players in South Africa
Scottish expatriate sportspeople in South Africa
Scottish emigrants to Canada
Footballers from North Lanarkshire